Polyarthra is an order of copepods belonging to the class Copepoda.

Taxonomy
There are two families recognised in the order Polyarthra:
 Canuellidae Lang, 1944
 Longipediidae Boeck, 1865

References

Copepods